John Rankin House may refer to:

John Rankin House (Brooklyn), listed on the National Register of Historic Places (NRHP) in Kings County
John Rankin House (Ripley, Ohio), listed on the NRHP in Brown County

See also
Rankin House (disambiguation)